Rocha John Rocha is a clothing and homewares brand designed by the fashion designer John Rocha. The ranges are sold exclusively at British department store Debenhams. 

Rocha John Rocha had his clothes in nearly every Debenhams store.

 

Clothing companies of the United Kingdom